Monument of Death is the début album by Norwegian death metal band Blood Red Throne.  The album was released on December 4, 2001 (see 2001 in music).

Track listing 
Portrait of a Killer (Testimony of the Dying) – 5:33
Souls of Damnation – 3:41
The Children Shall Endure – 3:19
Dream Controlled Murder – 4:25
Mary Whispers of Death – 4:53
Ravenous War Machine – 5:56
Malignant Nothingness – 3:33
Monument of Death – 3:08
Path of Flesh – 4:24

Bonus tracks 
Ravenous War Machine (Demo 2000)
The Children Shall Endure (Demo 2000)
Dream Controlled Murder (Demo 2000)
Mary Whispers Of Death (Demo 2000)
Monument Of Death (taken from Nordic metal Comp. II)

Line-up 
Død: Guitar
Tchort: Guitar
Erlend Caspersen: Bass
Mr. Hustler: vocals
Freddy Bolsø: - drums

2001 debut albums
Blood Red Throne albums